Palumbia eristaloides is a species of hoverfly in the family Syrphidae.

Distribution
Palearctic.

References

Eristalinae
Insects described in 1887
Diptera of Europe
Taxa named by Josef Aloizievitsch Portschinsky